Shipping Wars is a reality television series that aired on A&E from January 10, 2012 to April 29, 2015. Season 9 premiered on November 30, 2021 with a new cast of shippers. The show follows various independent shippers who have discovered that money can be made transporting large/bulky/unusual items that traditional carriers either cannot or will not haul. They compete for shipments in timed auctions held by uShip, one of the largest online auction houses for independent shippers.

Overview
In seasons 1-8, the shippers place bids on two shipments listed on uShip, in a reverse auction format. Bids are generally made with comments about the likely costs and risks, as well as the motives and abilities. When the time limit for an auction runs out, the job is typically awarded to the lowest bidder; at the client's discretion, however, it may be awarded to a higher bidder with a better average feedback rating from past clients. Feedback ratings are used to break any ties for the lowest bid. In season 9, the shippers receive their loads from a shipping broker, and the bidding process isn't shown.

Winners load their cargo and attempt to deliver it intact by the client's  or receiver's deadline. Feedback ratings from clients appear after the loads have been delivered. At the end of the episode, each shipper's revenue is tallied on-screen, with the expenses (fuel, labor, late-delivery penalties, fines, etc.) subtracted from the bid amount to determine the overall profit or loss. At times, a shipper will arrange to haul one or more additional loads on the same trip, with the extra money figured into their tally. In some cases, the shipper will be unable to complete a job due to concerns over load size/weight or road safety. On occasion, one shipper will enlist the services of another to help complete a job; the shippers then decide between themselves how to split the proceeds. In seasons 1-8, the progress of each shipment is interspersed with humorous criticisms from the other shippers.

Episodes

Shippers

Reception
David Wiegand of the San Francisco Chronicle says the show is "well made and fun to watch". David Knowles of The Hollywood Reporter states, "Though the fast paced editing scheme manages to keep the point and click bidding from feeling as droll as Internet auctions are in real life, the relentlessly quick hits of dialog and action make the proceedings feel like a teaser rather than the actual program". Monica Hesse of The Washington Post states, "Shipping Wars is mostly about the perfectly packed trunk and the ecstasy of having not an inch to spare".

International broadcasts
In the UK, Shipping Wars is broadcast on the History TV channels.

The series made its debut in Canada on OLN; it currently airs on CMT Canada. In India, this show is broadcast on History TV 18. The German network N24 broadcasts a dubbed version since April 2014. The France network 6ter broadcasts a French dubbed version since September 2015. In Australia it is broadcast on the free-to-air channel 7 Mate.

Shipping Wars UK
On 5 January 2014, Channel 4 aired the pilot of the UK version of Shipping Wars titled Shipping Wars UK. The format closely follows the US version.
The pilot received over a million viewers and, on 9 April 2014, it was announced that 20 episodes had been commissioned. Each episode will run to 45 minutes and will be produced by Megalomedia.
On the 2nd May 2016 a second series started on Channel 4, the second series let the shippers travel to different European countries.

References

External links
 
 

2012 American television series debuts
2015 American television series endings
2010s American reality television series
Freight transport
A&E (TV network) original programming
English-language television shows
Auction television series